Berel Wein (born March 25, 1934) is an American-born Orthodox rabbi, lecturer and writer. He authored several books, in both Hebrew and English (the latter published by Artscroll), concerning Jewish history and popularized the subject through more than 1,000 audio tapes, newspaper articles and international lectures. Throughout his career, he has retained personal and ideological ties to both Modern Orthodox and Haredi Judaism.

Family
Wein was born March 25, 1934 in Chicago to a family descended from Lithuanian rabbis. His father, Rabbi Zev Wein, emigrated to the United States and served as a Rabbi in Chicago until the 1970s.

In 1955 he married Yocheved (Jackie) Levin, who had been born in Lithuania, in 1934 and had emigrated to Detroit with her parents at the age of 4. The couple settled in Chicago and had four children,  had 29 grandchildren and 70 great-grandchildren.

Wein's wife died in 2006 and he remarried; his second wife Mira Cohen Wein died in 2018.
Wein lives in Rehavia.

Biography

In America
Wein received semicha (rabbinic ordination) from Hebrew Theological College, which was founded by his maternal grandfather,  Rabbi Chaim Tzvi Rubinstein.  His main teacher was Rabbi Chaim Kreiswirth and his personal mentors there included Rabbis Mordechai Rogow and Yisrael Mendel Kaplan. He was a student of the late Rabbi Oscar Z. Fasman in Chicago, and spoke at the latter's funeral.

He received a Bachelor's degree from Roosevelt University in Chicago and earned a law degree from DePaul University. After passing the Illinois Bar he practiced as an attorney in Chicago for a number of years.

In 1964, Wein accepted the pulpit of Beth Israel Congregation in Miami Beach, Florida, where he remained until 1972. He moved to New York City when he was appointed as executive vice-president of the Union of Orthodox Organizations of America (known as the Orthodox Union). Within that organization, he served as rabbinic administrator of the kashrut (kosher foods) supervision division until 1977.

At the same time, he founded Congregation Bais Torah in Suffern, New York, and served as its rabbi for the next 24 years. Wein also founded Yeshiva Shaarei Torah of Rockland with a large high school and a smaller post-high school division in 1977. The yeshiva subsequently moved onto the grounds of his synagogue and he served as Rosh Yeshiva (dean) until his move to Israel in 1997. His son, Rabbi Chaim Tzvi Wein, succeeded him as Rosh Yeshiva (along with Rabbi Mordechai Wolmark, author of Mishnas Mordechai).

In Israel
Rabbi Wein and his wife moved to Israel in 1997. They settled in the Rehavia neighborhood of Jerusalem, where they became Rav and Rebbetzin at Bet Knesset Hanasi (at 24 Usshishkin). In Israel, Wein also established The Destiny Foundation, a marketing forum for his CDs, audio tapes and books as well as drama and documentary film projects.

He is presently a senior faculty member of Ohr Somayach Yeshiva in Jerusalem, where he lectures to the mostly English-speaking student body. He also lectures extensively in Israel and abroad, and writes a regular weekly column for The Jerusalem Post since 1999.

Teaching
During his years in America, Wein produced many audio tapes (recordings) on both Torah teachings and Jewish history. These helped to popularize the latter subject, which had often been neglected in traditional Orthodox Jewish education. After detailed research, he went on to publish a four-volume series of coffee table books spanning 2,300 years of Jewish history, for which he is widely known in English-speaking Orthodox communities:

Echoes of Glory: The story of the Jews in the Classical Era, 350 BCE-750 CE
Herald of Destiny: The story of the Jews in the Medieval Era, 750-1650
Triumph of Survival: The story of the Jews in the Modern Era, 1650-1995
Faith and Fate: The story of the Jewish people in the twentieth century

Wein is known for his witty speaking and writing style: his sayings and observations have been collected together, by James Weiss, into a 283-page book entitled Vintage Wein: The collected wit and wisdom, the choicest anecdotes and vignettes of Rabbi Berel Wein (Shaar Press, 1992). Since his move to Israel, he has also penned three collections of essays, titled Second Thoughts: A collection of musings and observations (1997), Buy Green Bananas: Observations on self, family and life (1999), and Living Jewish: Values, Practices and Traditions. He has also authored commentaries on Ethics of Our Fathers, Pirkei Avos : Teachings for Our Times, and on the Passover Haggadah, The Pesach Haggadah: Through the Prism of Experience and History. Tending the Vineyard, is a personal, a detailed guide for aspiring pulpit rabbis, in which he shares his philosophy of the rabbinate, and relates first-hand experiences and dispenses advice to rabbinic students. In May 2013, Rabbi Wein co-authored "The Legacy: Teachings for Life from the Great Lithuanian Rabbis", with Warren Goldstein, Chief Rabbi of South Africa (published by Maggid Books, an imprint of Koren Publishers Jerusalem). His autobiography, "Teach Them Diligently: The Personal Story of a Community Rabbi" became available in June 2014.

Wein mentions his Wein Press in his 2020 In My Opinion volume, which he published via his Destiny Foundation organization.

Bibliography

Books by Berel Wein

Hebrew
Chikrei Halacha (1976), published by Mosad Harav Kook
Eyunim B'Mesechtot HaTalmud (1989) 2 volumes
Chukei Chaim (1991), edited by his very close disciple Rabbi Harel Kohen
Bamesila Nale''' (2014), edited by his very close disciple Rabbi Harel Kohen 

English
Twenty of his English language books were published by Artscroll; among them are:
 Four-volume series:
 Echoes of Glory: The Story of the Jews in the Classical Era, 350 BCE-750 CE Herald of Destiny: The Story of the Jews in the Medieval Era, 750-1650 (1993) 
 Triumph of Survival: The Story of the Jews in the Modern Era Faith and Fate: The Story of the Jews in the Twentieth CenturyWein's 2020 In My Opinion was published by his Destiny Foundation.

Co-authored books
Real Messiah: A Jewish Response to Missionaries by Aryeh Kaplan, Berel Wein, and Pinchas Stolper (1976), 
Sand and Stars (2 vol.) by Yaffa Ganz and Berel Wein (1996), 
The Legacy: Teachings for Life from the Great Lithuanian Rabbis by Warren Goldstein and Berel Wein (2013), 

DVDs
Rashi – A Light After the Dark Ages (with Leonard Nimoy) (1999)
Berel Wein's Israel Journey – Jerusalem (co-authored with Wayne Kopping) (2003)
Rambam – The Story of Maimonides by Leonard Nimoy, Armand Assante, Ashley Lazarus, and Berel Wein (2005)
Faith & Fate – The Story of the Jewish People in the Twentieth Century Episode II (1911–1920) narrated by Debra Winger and Dick Rodstein (Directed by Ashley Lazarus) (2005) as well as episodes 1,3,4, and 5

References
General: "Rebbetzin Yocheved (Jackie) Wein, a"h", by T. Silber, Hamodia'', May 31, 2006, p. A15.

External links
Rabbi Wein's website
Short Bio & Free MP3 Lectures by Rabbi Berel Wein at TorahDownloads.com
Official biography and current projects
Links to Berel Wein's articles on the online Jerusalem Post
JewishHistory.org Rabbi Wein's free crash course in Jewish history
Congregation Bais Torah official site
Shaarei Torah of Rockland (high school stats)
The story of the Jewish people by Berel Wein (article)
Judaism has never been scared of democracy by Berel Wein (article) 
Laws and Legality by Berel Wein (article)
Berel Wein at Ohr Somayach

1934 births
Living people
Rosh yeshivas
American columnists
American people of Lithuanian-Jewish descent
American Orthodox rabbis
Modern Orthodox rabbis
Religious Zionist Orthodox rabbis
Rabbis from Chicago
American emigrants to Israel
20th-century American rabbis
21st-century rabbis in Jerusalem
Rabbis of Ohr Somayach
Roosevelt University alumni
DePaul University alumni